Alec Andrews Burgess (2 January 1906 – 20 November 1990) was an English cricketer.  Burgess was a right-handed batsman who was a leg break bowler.  He was born at Peterborough, Northamptonshire.

Burgess made a single first-class appearance for Northamptonshire against Sussex at the Town Ground, Peterborough in the 1929 County Championship.  In Northamptonshire's first-innings he was dismissed for 13 by Albert Wensley, while in their second-innings he was dismissed for a single run by Maurice Tate.  He later played for Suffolk in the 1934 and 1935 Minor Counties Championship, making three appearances.

He died at Waveney, Suffolk on 20 November 1990.

References

External links
Alec Burgess at ESPNcricinfo
Alec Burgess at CricketArchive

1906 births
1990 deaths
Sportspeople from Peterborough
English cricketers
Northamptonshire cricketers
Suffolk cricketers